Luis Schlögl is an Austrian luger who competed in the early 1950s. He won a silver medal in the men's doubles event at the 1952 European luge championships in Garmisch-Partenkirchen, West Germany.

References

External links
List of European luge champions 

Austrian male lugers
Possibly living people
Year of birth missing